The Trinbago Knight Riders are a women's cricket team that compete in the Women's Caribbean Premier League and The 6ixty, representing Trinidad and Tobago. The formation of the team was announced in March 2022, aligned with the equivalent men's team, playing their first match in August 2022.

The team's first squad was announced in June 2022, with the side captained by Deandra Dottin. The side won the inaugural Women's Caribbean Premier League, beating Barbados Royals in the final.

History
On 14 March 2022, Cricket West Indies announced their intention to hold the first Women's Caribbean Premier League, to run alongside the men's tournament, which began in 2013. Trinbago Knight Riders were one of three teams announced to be taking part in the tournament, aligned with one of the men's teams. The team's squad was announced on 16 June 2022, with Deandra Dottin announced as captain of the team. The inaugural Women's Caribbean Premier League is scheduled to begin on 31 August 2022.

On 22 June 2022, it was announced that a T10 tournament would precede the Women's CPL, taking place from 24 to 28 August, known as The 6ixty and involving the three teams competing in the main tournament. The side topped the initial group stage in the inaugural edition of The 6ixty, but lost to Barbados Royals in the final by 15 runs. In the inaugural Women's Caribbean Premier League, the side topped the initial group stage before beating Barbados Royals in the final by 10 runs to win the competition.

Players

Current squad
As per 2022 season. Players in bold have international caps.

Seasons

The 6ixty

Women's Caribbean Premier League

See also
 Trinbago Knight Riders
 Trinidad and Tobago women's national cricket team

References

Cricket in Trinidad and Tobago
Women's Caribbean Premier League teams
Cricket clubs established in 2022
Red Chillies Entertainment